Abdul Rahman Khalid (born 17 January 1966) is a Bahraini modern pentathlete and fencer. He competed in the pentathlon and épée events at the 1988 Summer Olympics.

References

1966 births
Living people
Bahraini male épée fencers
Bahraini male modern pentathletes
Olympic fencers of Bahrain
Olympic modern pentathletes of Bahrain
Fencers at the 1988 Summer Olympics
Modern pentathletes at the 1988 Summer Olympics
Fencers at the 2006 Asian Games
Modern pentathletes at the 2002 Asian Games
Asian Games competitors for Bahrain